The Rodrigues rail (Erythromachus leguati), also known as Leguat's gelinote or Leguat's rail, is an extinct species of the rail family that was endemic to the Mascarene island of Rodrigues, east of Madagascar in the Indian Ocean. It is generally kept in its own genus, Erythromachus, but has sometimes been assigned to the genus Aphanapteryx along with its close relative the red rail (A. bonasia) of Mauritius; their relationship with other rails is unclear. It was described as having grey plumage, a red beak, red legs, and a naked red patch around the eye. The beak was long and curved downwards. It was flightless and fed on tortoise eggs. It was described as being attracted to red objects, which humans exploited while hunting it.

The Rodrigues rail is believed to have become extinct in the mid-18th century because of predation by introduced cats and destruction of its habitat by tortoise hunters. The bird was first documented from life by two contemporaneous accounts; first by François Leguat, a French Huguenot refugee marooned on Rodrigues in 1691, and then by Julien Tafforet, marooned on the island in 1726. Subfossil remains were later discovered and connected with the old accounts in 1874, and the species was named E. leguati in Leguat's honour.

Taxonomy 
In 1848, the English zoologist Hugh Edwin Strickland called attention to a bird mentioned in the French traveller François Leguat's 1708 memoir about his stay on the Mascarene island of Rodrigues. Leguat referred to the birds as "gelinottes" (translated as "wood-hens"), a name Strickland thought implied the grouse of Europe, though this was not consistent with the form of the beak described by Leguat. Strickland was unable to classify the bird further, but noted similarities with the dodo (Raphus cucullatus) and kiwi (Apteryx), based on unidentified birds from Mauritius illustrated by the travellers Pieter van den Broecke and Sir Thomas Herbert, which he thought related. Strickland also noted similarities with a bird from Mauritius, which would later be identified as the red rail (Aphanapteryx bonasia).

In 1874, the French zoologist Alphonse Milne-Edwards connected Leguat's account with three subfossil bones (a sternum, a tarsometatarsus, and a fragmentary skull) found in caves of the Plaine Corail region, Rodrigues. He recognised their similarity to those of the red rail, while noting it supposedly had a straighter beak (as described by Leguat). The name Erythromachus was incorrectly explained as referring to the Erythraean sea by the American ornithologist Charles Wallace Richmond in 1908. The name Miserythrus, from "red" and "hatred", was used by the English ornithologist Alfred Newton in 1874 (originally only in a manuscript), and also refers to the rail's behaviour towards red, but as a newer name, it is a junior synonym. Milne-Edwards did not select a holotype specimen for the species from the bones he had loaned from Cambridge University Museum of Zoology for his study, but a syntype series was later listed from specimens there, presumably by A. Newton.

In 1875, A. Newton also identified a reference to the bird in the 1726 account of the French traveller Julien Tafforet, which had recently been rediscovered. In 1879, more fossils, including skulls, were described by the zoologists Albert Günther and Edward Newton (brother of Alfred), who confirmed that the bird was a rail, and also noted that some specimens had beaks as curved as that of the red rail. In 1921, the American linguist Geoffroy Atkinson questioned the bird's existence, in an article that doubted the veracity of Leguat's memoir. The American ornithologist James Greenway suggested in 1967 that Leguat's description referred to wind-blown purple swamphens (Porphyrio), since the word grey is sometimes used synonymously with blue in old descriptions. This idea has not been accepted by other commentators. Today, it is widely accepted that Leguat's memoirs represent credible observations of local birds in life.

In 1999, the French palaeontologist Cécile Mourer-Chauviré and colleagues pointed out that a carpometacarpus bone assigned to the Rodrigues rail and illustrated by Günther and E. Newton in 1879 does not belong to a rail, and therefore not this bird. More subfossils have since been discovered, including an associated but incomplete skeleton with a complete skull and jaws found in Caverne Poule Rouge in 2005.

Evolution 

Apart from being a close relative to the red rail, the relationships of the Rodrigues rail are uncertain and the two are commonly listed as separate genera, Aphanapteryx and Erythromachus, but have sometimes been united as species of Aphanapteryx. Günther and E. Newton first generically synonymised the two in 1879 because of their skeletal similarities. In 1945, the French palaeontologist Jean Piveteau found skull features of the two species different enough for generic separation, and in 1977, the American ornithologist Storrs L. Olson stated that though the two species were similar and derived from the same stock, they had also diverged considerably, and should possibly be kept separate. Based on geographic location and the morphology of the nasal bones, Olson suggested that they were related to the genera Gallirallus, Dryolimnas, Atlantisia, and Rallus. The American ornithologist Bradley C. Livezey was unable to determine the affinities of the Rodrigues and red rail in 1998, stating that some of the features uniting them and some other rails were associated with the loss of flight rather than common descent. He also suggested that the grouping of the Rodrigues and red rail into the same genus may have been influenced by their geographical distribution. Mourer-Chauviré and colleagues also considered the two as belonging to separate genera.

Rails have reached many oceanic archipelagos, which has frequently led to speciation and evolution of flightlessness. According to the British researchers Anthony S. Cheke and Julian P. Hume in 2008, the fact that the red rail lost much of its feather structure indicates it was isolated for a long time. These rails may be of Asian origin, like many other Mascarene birds. In 2019, Hume supported the distinction of the two genera, and cited the relation between the extinct Mauritius scops owl (Otus sauzieri) and the Rodrigues scops owl (Otus murivorus) as another example of the diverging evolutionary paths on these islands. He stated that the relationships of the Rodrigues and red rails was more unclear than that of other extinct Mascarene rails, with many of their distinct features being related to flightlessness and modifications to their jaws due to their diet, suggesting a long period of isolation. He suggested their ancestors could have arrived on the Mascarenes during the middle Miocene at the earliest, but it may have happened more recently. The speed with which these features evolved may also have been affected by gene flow, resource availability, and climate events. Flightlessness can evolve rapidly in rails, sometimes repeatedly within the same groups, as in Dryolimnas, so the distinctness of the Rodrigues and red rails may not have taken long to evolve; some other specialised rails evolved in less than 1–3 million years. Hume suggested that the two rails were probably related to Dryolimnas, but their considerably different morphology made it difficult to establish how. In general, rails are adept at colonising islands, and can become flightless within a few generations in environments without predators, yet this also makes them vulnerable to human activities.

Description 

It may have weighed at least . Subfossil remains exhibit a large variation in size, which may reflect sexual dimorphism. It had bright grey plumage, perhaps flecked with white. Its beak and legs were red, and it had a red, naked area (or wattle) around its eyes. The cranium of the Rodrigues rail was slightly elongated, convex in every direction, and compressed from top to bottom in side-view. It had a narrow, long frontal region,  at its least width.

The beak was long and curved downwards as in the red rail, but the narial openings were longer. The premaxilla that comprised most of the upper bill was long, shallow in side-view, with a narrow nasal bone, and its total length was almost 60% longer than the cranium. The culmen of the beak was almost straight above the nostril, and the nasal bone was slightly longer than the cranium. The narial (nostril) opening was very long, 66% of the rostrum's length. There were foramina (openings) on the upper bill, which did not extend to the front edge of the narial opening. The mandible was long and narrow, ending in a sharp point, with the length of the mandibular symphysis (the area where the halves of the mandible meet) being about 65% of the cranium's length. The mandible had large, deep set foramina, which ran almost up to a deep sulcus (furrow) at the centre of the mandible. Günther and Newton stated that the examined beaks varied greatly in size and shape; some specimens had short and almost straight beaks, while others had much longer beaks (up to one third longer) that were prominently curved. These writers were unsure whether this was related to the overall size of an individual bird or to sexual dimorphism. Livezy was unable to confirm the idea that the differences in the beaks reflected dimorphism in 2003, but thought it probable. Hume examined all available upper beaks in 2019, but found no differences in curvature.

The bones associated with the forelimbs were generally small in proportion to the bird. The coracoid was short but wide, and the sternum was also small. The hindlimb elements were generally very robust. The fibula was also short and robust. The proportions of the legs, pelvis and sacrum of the Rodrigues and red rail were generally similar. The Rodrigues rail differed from the red rail by having a broader and shorter skull, longer and lower nostrils, a proportionately longer humerus, a shorter, stouter femur, as well as a considerably different plumage, based on early descriptions. The Dutch ornithologist Marc Herremans suggested in 1989 that the Rodrigues and red rails were neotenic, with juvenile features such as weak pectoral apparatuses and downy plumage.

Contemporary accounts 

The Rodrigues rail was first recorded by Leguat in his 1708 memoir A New Voyage to the East Indies. He was the leader of a group of nine French Huguenot refugees which were the first to colonise Rodrigues from 1691 to 1693, after they were marooned there by their captain. Leguat's observations are considered some of the first cohesive accounts of animal behaviour in the wild, and his full account of the bird reads as follows:

Another description of appearance and behaviour is found in a document called Relation de l'Ile Rodrigue attributed to Tafforet, who was marooned on Rodrigues in 1726:

Unlike the red rail and other extinct Mascarene birds, the Rodrigues rail was not illustrated by contemporaneous artists. Olson described reconstructions made for the British zoologist Walter Rothschild's 1907 book Extinct Birds and the Japanese ornithologist Masauji Hachisuka's 1953 book The Dodo and Kindred Birds as "rather fanciful". The English artist Frederick William Frohawk based his restoration in the former book on an outline illustration, which was in turn based on a sketch drawn by Herbert, which is now known to depict the red rail. The German zoologist Hermann Schlegel thought it depicted a species of dodo (which he called Didus herbertii) from Rodrigues when he drew the outline in 1854, and that it was the species mentioned by Leguat.

Behaviour and ecology 

According to Tafforet's account, the Rodrigues rail fed on the eggs of the now extinct Cylindraspis tortoises, three species of which lived on Rodrigues. As it took advantage of their breeding season, Hume considered it an opportunistic predator, which perhaps also fed on hatchling tortoises. A former tortoise breeding area in the Plaine Corail shows that such sites were concentrated into a small area containing large numbers of eggs; the phalanx bone of a Rodrigues rail has been found among the egg remains. The rails would have fattened themselves seasonally, but at other times of the year, they probably fed on snails and other invertebrates, as well as scavenging sea bird colonies. The Rodrigues rail probably fed on worms, such as Kontikia whartoni and the now extinct Geonemertes rodericana, by probing leaf-litter or rotting wood. Sexual dimorphism may have reflected differences in diet between the sexes.

Since Leguat was unable to locate its nests, the Rodrigues rail may have nested outside the easily accessible open forest as was typical in coastal and lowland areas, and rather nested deep in forested valleys or mountainous hills of the interior, according to Hume. Its nests may have been well concealed in vegetation on the ground, as is the case of other flightless rails. Like the red rail, it was said to be attracted to the colour red, but the significance of this is unknown. This behaviour led Hume to call it an "aggressive species". According to Milne-Edwards, the bird had legs "made for running".

Many other species endemic to Rodrigues became extinct after humans arrived, and the island's ecosystem was heavily damaged. Before humans arrived, forests covered the island entirely, but very little of those remain today. The Rodrigues rail lived alongside other recently extinct birds, such as the Rodrigues solitaire (Pezophaps solitaria), the Rodrigues parrot (Necropsittacus rodricanus), Newton's parakeet (Psittacula exsul), the Rodrigues starling (Necropsar rodericanus), the Rodrigues scops owl, the Rodrigues night heron (Nycticorax megacephalus), and the Rodrigues pigeon (Nesoenas rodericanus). Extinct reptiles include the domed Rodrigues giant tortoise (Cylindraspis peltastes), the saddle-backed Rodrigues giant tortoise (Cylindraspis vosmaeri), and the Rodrigues day gecko (Phelsuma edwardnewtoni).

Extinction 
Many terrestrial rails are flightless, and island populations are particularly vulnerable to man-made changes; as a result, rails have suffered more extinctions than any other family of birds. All six endemic species of Mascarene rails are extinct, caused by human activities. For at least a century the Rodrigues rail may have coexisted with rats, which were perhaps introduced by a group of sailors from a Dutch ship marooned there in 1644. Though rats were well established and numerous by the time Leguat and Tafforet stayed on the island, the rails also remained common, perhaps due to their aggressive nature. The French began settling Rodrigues in 1735 (to supply Mauritius with tortoise meat), which must have taken a toll on the rails through hunting and deforestation, but their rapid disappearance was probably caused by cats introduced to control the rats around 1750, and the species may have gone extinct within a decade. In 1763, the French astronomer Alexandre Guy Pingré noted the absence of this and other birds on Rodrigues by the time of his visit to observe the 1761 transit of Venus:

References

External links 
 
 

Rodrigues rail
Extinct flightless birds
Fauna of Rodrigues
Extinct birds of Indian Ocean islands
Bird extinctions since 1500
Rodrigues rail
Taxa named by Alphonse Milne-Edwards